The Alces River, is a river in Northeastern British Columbia, Canada, a tributary of the Peace River. It enters Peace River at 56 01' 38" N 120 03' 20"W. It flows south, and is about 70 km (42 miles) long.

See also
List of British Columbia rivers

References

Northern Interior of British Columbia
Rivers of British Columbia